Ben Mikaelsen (born November 24, 1952) is a Bolivian American writer of children's literature.

Early life and education
Ben Mikaelsen was born on November 24, 1952, in La Paz, Bolivia, the son of missionary parents of Danish descent. He wasn't sent to school until fourth grade where he was bullied for his race. Mikaelsen moved to the United States with his family shortly before entering seventh grade, where he encountered further bullying because of his poor English capabilities. As a teen in Minnesota, he taught himself to swim and dive, and this led him to take flight and skydiving lessons. Mikaelsen attended USC and Bemidji State University.

Personal life
When building his home in Montana Ben adopted an American black bear named Buffy for 26 years until the bear's death in September 2012. Ben Mikaelsen considered Buffy a "750-pound member of my family." He has been writing full-time since 1984 and lives in Anacortes, Washington with his wife, Connie. He has written a few books inspired by his bear, such as Touching Spirit Bear and the sequel Ghost of Spirit Bear. He also took a year out of high school to join a parachute team and compete around Minnesota. He goes around the country visiting schools to teach kids about his life and his experience as a victim of bullying.

Published works
Rescue Josh McGuire (1991)
Stranded (1995)
Countdown (1996)
Petey (1998)
Touching Spirit Bear (2001)
Red Midnight (2002)
Tree Girl (2004)
Ghost of Spirit Bear (2008)
Jungle of Bones (2014)

Awards and honors
Mikaelson's work has won many state youth literature awards, including the California Young Reader Medal and Wyoming's Indian Paintbrush Book Award.

1991: Golden Spur, Juvenile Fiction, Rescue Josh McGuire
1992: International Reading Association Children's Book Award, Older Reader Category, Rescue Josh McGuire
1999: ALA Best Fiction for Young Adults, Petey
1999: Golden Spur, Juvenile Fiction, Petey
2002: ALA Best Fiction for Young Adults, Touching Spirit Bear

References

External links
 
Interview at Children's Book Radio (MP3), 2007 audio file
 

1952 births
Living people
American children's writers
American people of Danish descent
Bolivian children's writers
Bolivian emigrants to the United States
Bolivian people of Danish descent
Writers from Bozeman, Montana
Hispanic and Latino American writers